Roy Boateng (born 21 January 1996) is an Ghanaian soccer player who plays as a defender.

Career

Youth and college
Boateng played four years of college soccer at the University of California, Davis between 2015 and 2018, making 82 appearances for the Aggies, scoring 6 goals and tallying 1 assist. Boateng redshirted the 2014 season.

While at college, Boateng appeared for USL PDL side Portland Timbers U23s in both 2016 and 2017, and San Francisco Glens in 2018.

New York Red Bulls II
On January 11, 2019, Boateng was drafted 16th overall in the 2019 MLS SuperDraft by New York Red Bulls. He signed for the Red Bull's USL Championship side New York Red Bulls II on March 8, 2019. He was released by Red Bulls II on November 30, 2020.

References

External links
UC Davis bio
MLS bio
USL bio

1996 births
Living people
Association football defenders
UC Davis Aggies men's soccer players
Ghanaian footballers
Portland Timbers U23s players
San Francisco Glens players
New York Red Bulls II players
New York Red Bulls draft picks
Soccer players from California
Footballers from Accra
USL Championship players
USL League Two players
FC Motown players
National Premier Soccer League players